Suresh Dhanjibhai Patel is an Indian politician and member of the Bharatiya Janata Party. Patel is a first term member of the Gujarat Legislative Assembly in 2014 from the  Maninagar constituency in Eastern side of city Ahmedabad. He was chosen as replacement of Narendra Modi who resigned from the seat to become Prime Minister of India.

References 

Politicians from Ahmedabad
Gujarat MLAs 2012–2017
Living people
Bharatiya Janata Party politicians from Gujarat
Gujarat MLAs 2017–2022
Year of birth missing (living people)